Weißkogel is the name of the following mountains in the Alps:

 Längentaler Weißer Kogel in the Stubai Alps
 Weißkugel in the Ötztal Alps
 Winnebacher Weißkogel in the Stubai Alps